Broughton is a ghost town in Clay County, Kansas, United States.  It is located a few miles southeast of Clay Center.

History
Broughton was founded in 1869.  It was razed in 1966 during the construction of Milford Lake.  The communities of Alida and Broughton were razed, while the cities of Wakefield and Milford were moved to higher ground.

References

Further reading

 Broughton Kansas: Portrait of a Lost Town 1869-1966; M.J. Morgan; Chapman Center for Rural Studies at KSU; 2010; .

External links
 A short film about Broughton, Kansas, a Lost Town, YouTube
 The Vanished Community of Broughton, Kansas, KSU
 Photos of Broughton, Lost Kansas Communities
 1907 photo of Broughton, WSU Library
 Clay County maps: Current, Historic, KDOT

Ghost towns in Kansas